Ulva brevistipita is a species of blackish-green coloured seaweed in the family Ulvaceae that can be found in Australia and New Zealand.

References

Ulvaceae
Plants described in 1956
Flora of Australia
Flora of New Zealand